Niece Motorsports is an American professional stock car racing team that currently competes in the NASCAR Craftsman Truck Series. Owned by Al Niece, it currently fields the No. 41 Chevrolet Silverado for multiple drivers, the No. 42  Chevrolet Silverado full-time for Carson Hocevar, and the No. 45 Chevrolet Silverado full-time for Lawless Alan. Niece Motorsports formerly had a technical alliance with GMS Racing.

Xfinity Series

Car No. 17 history
In 2018, the team attempted to make their NASCAR Xfinity Series debut with Victor Gonzalez Jr. driving at Watkins Glen.

Craftsman Truck Series

Truck No. 22 history
On October 30, 2017, it was announced that Austin Wayne Self moved to Niece Motorsports to drive the No. 22 truck full-time in 2018.

Truck No. 22 results

Truck No. 38 history
In 2017, the No. 38 truck ran two races with T. J. Bell as a start-and-park team.

In 2018 the No. 38 truck planned to run at least four races with Max McLaughlin as the driver, starting at Eldora. McLaughlin qualified for the race and finished 12th in his NASCAR debut. However, the deal fell through and McLaughlin only ran at Eldora. Ross Chastain ran 3 races (Bristol, Texas 2 and Homestead-Miami) with the best finish of 12th at Bristol. Bell returned to the No. 38 in Las Vegas in September and finished 21st due to a crash. Landon Huffman also drove for the team, he failed to qualify at Martinsville 2 and finished 25th at ISM Raceway.

In 2019, Bell returned once again to the No. 38 as a field-filler at Kansas, since only 30 trucks showed up. Chastain drove the No. 38 with sponsorship from TruNorth Global at Texas 2 and finished 10th.

Truck No. 38 results

Truck No. 40 history

In 2020, the team fielded the No. 40 and it is being shared by Ross Chastain, Garrett Smithley, Ryan Truex, T. J. Bell, Travis Pastrana, Carson Hocevar, Trevor Bayne, and Bayley Currey.

In 2021, Truex returned to the No. 40 for full-time schedule.

In 2022, Dean Thompson would drive this truck full-time.

Truck No. 40 results

Truck No. 41 history

Ross Chastain would drive this 5th Niece Motorsports truck at Atlanta, Darlington, Texas, Charlotte, and Sonoma. Later on, Tyler Carpenter would drive this truck at Knoxville after winning the Gateway Nationals.

Truck No. 41 results

Truck No. 42 history

In 2020, Ross Chastain announced that he would drive the No. 42 part-time. Mark Smith, Conor Daly, James Buescher, and Carson Hocevar also drove this truck.

In 2021, Carson Hocevar announced that he would drive the No. 42 full-time. He returned to the 42 truck in 2022. On June 4, Hocevar was injured during the final lap of the Gateway race when his truck was broadsided by Tyler Hill. He underwent surgery on his tibia prior to the Sonoma race. Hocevar took the pole position before wrecking on turn 10. On lap 11, he was relieved by Daniel Suárez, who took the No. 42 to a sixth place finish.

Truck No. 42 results

Truck No. 44 history

On January 31, 2019, Timothy Peters announced that he would join Niece for the first three events of the 2019 NASCAR Gander Outdoors Truck Series schedule. After two top-tens in his first two events, Peters said that there is the possibility to run more races with the team. Reid Wilson drove the No. 44 truck in 2 races (Martinsville 1 and Dover) with a best finish of 13th at Dover. Angela Ruch is scheduled to drive the No. 44 truck in 12 races in 2019. Jeb Burton drove the truck in the July race at Kentucky. Ty Majeski drove the truck at ISM.

Natalie Decker signed with the team for the 2020 season. On February 14, 2020, she finished fifth at Daytona, becoming the highest-finishing female driver in Truck Series history. She missed the Pocono race after being hospitalized for bile duct complications related to her gall bladder surgery in December 2019. On September 25, Decker was not medically cleared to race at Las Vegas; because her truck had cleared inspection and was placed on the starting grid, she was credited with a last-place finish in the race.

In 2021, James Buescher raced at season opening at Daytona. Jett Noland drove at Daytona Road Course and Richmond. Conor Daly drove at Vegas. Logan Bearden failed to qualify at the Toyota Tundra 225 and Morgan Alexander crashed at the Corn Belt 150. Dean Thompson will race at the season finale before moving full-time to the team next year.

In 2022, Kris Wright would drive the No. 44 truck full-time. Wright was dropped from the team before the Richmond race, with Chad Chastain filling in for him.

Truck No. 44 results

Truck No. 45 history

Niece Motorsports made their debut in 2016 with Casey Smith driving for two races.

The team returned in 2017, at first planning on running only part-time but were able to run the full schedule with various drivers, with T. J. Bell driving most of the races.

In 2018, it was announced that Justin Fontaine would drive the No. 45 truck full-time. Fontaine started the season with a top 10 finish at Daytona and Las Vegas.

On January 18, 2019, it was announced that Ross Chastain and Reid Wilson would split driving duties for the upcoming season. Chastain started off the year with two of the best results in team history, a third at Daytona and a sixth at Atlanta. In April, Kyle Benjamin joined the team for a seven-race schedule starting at Texas in June. On May 10, 2019 Ross Chastain delivered his first truck win and the team's first win at Kansas after Stewart Friesen's underfueled truck ran out of gas with three laps remaining.
In June, he announced his intention to switch to Truck Series points to compete for a championship in the series. Chastain finished the season with 3 wins, 10 Top-5, 19 Top-10, 1 pole and finishing 2nd in the standings.

On December 10, 2019, it was announced that Ty Majeski would drive this truck full-time for the 2020 NASCAR Gander RV & Outdoors Truck Series season, replacing Chastain. 
After 15 races Majeski was replaced by Trevor Bayne for undisclosed reasons.

In 2021, it was announced that Brett Moffitt would drive the No. 45 truck full time. 
After 6 races Moffitt switched to Xfinity points. Bayley Currey came in as replacement  and Erik Darnell return to truck competition for one race at Darlington.  Chastain drove at Texas Motor Speedway.

In 2022, Lawless Alan would drive this truck full-time.

Truck No. 45 results

ARCA Menards Series

Car No. 40 history
In 2021, the fields the No. 40 Chevrolet SS for Dean Thompson at Kansas Speedway.

In 2022, the team will field the No. 40 Chevrolet SS for Matt Gould, son of crew chief Phil Gould, at Milwaukee Mile.

Car No. 40 results
(key) (Bold – Pole position awarded by qualifying time. Italics – Pole position earned by points standings or practice time. * – Most laps led.)

Car No. 50 history
In 2021, the team attempted to make their ARCA Menards Series debut with Jett Noland at Pocono Raceway. The team would later make starts with Morgan Alexander and Carson Hocevar.

References

External links
 

NASCAR teams
Auto racing teams established in 2016